"Represent" is the ninth song on Nas' debut album Illmatic. It is produced by DJ Premier who samples Lee Irwin's "Thief of Baghdad" for the song's beat.

Nas dedicates the song to a long list of people including future hip hop artist Cormega. RapReviews describes "Represent" as a "certified banger."

Composition 
The song's minimalistic beat, sampled from Lee Irwin's "Thief of Baghdad", consists of an electric piano sample and bells. Nas raps three verses and performs a spoken dedication to his friends at the track's end, but does not contribute to the chorus. Nas' verses deal with his life in the streets and his criminal ties. One specific lyric was "pulling the Tec out the dresser" was criticized by Jay-Z on his diss song "Takeover."

Sampling 
Lyrics from "Represent" are sampled in these songs:
 "Rap Game/Crack Game" by Jay-Z
 "Criminal" by Scientifik
 "Organized Rhyme" by Shabazz the Disciple

References 

1994 songs
Nas songs
Song recordings produced by DJ Premier
Songs written by Nas
Songs written by DJ Premier